Heat cost allocators are devices attached to individual radiators in buildings that measure the total heat output of the individual radiator. Heat cost allocators can be either electronic, where one or two electronic thermosensors and a microcontroller are used to calculate the heat consumption of radiator by the temperature difference between the radiator and the air in room, or evaporative, where a special, calibrated liquid in a capillary tube records the total heat absorbed from the air (for which an average allowance is made) in addition to that output by the radiator.

Tubes filled with methyl benzoate according to DIN EN 835 can be used by checking the color change.

Working principle:

As the radiator heats up, the back section also heats up. The temperature (or the temperature difference to room temperature for electronic two-sensor devices) is integrated over the heating period (one year according to the heating costs ordinance) and thus forms the measured value. Since the amount of heat emitted also depends on the size and type of radiator and the heat transfer between the radiator and the heat cost allocator, the measured value of each radiator is multiplied by an individual factor. This can be done in the heating bill. One then speaks of a unit scale, because every heat cost allocator is equipped with the same scale. If, on the other hand, the heat cost allocators on different radiators are equipped with different scales, so-called product scales, no conversion takes place because the factor has already been taken into account by the choice of scale. With electronic heat cost allocators, the scaling is achieved through programming. The evaluation factor is determined when the heat cost allocator is installed. For this purpose, the manufacturer and type of the radiator - as far as possible - are determined and measurements are taken. This leads to the radiator performance as the first part of the evaluation factor. The factor is then corrected by the so-called Kc value, which describes the heat transfer between the heating medium, ultimately the radiator, and the heat cost allocator. The radiator evaluation requires the knowledge of precise data about the heat cost allocator used and the radiator, which are obtained in extensive series of measurements and tests.

References

Heating